Chrysopasta is a genus of bristle flies in the family Tachinidae.

Species
Chrysopasta elegans Macquart, 1846

References 

Diptera of Australasia
Tachinidae genera
Dexiinae
Taxa named by Friedrich Moritz Brauer
Taxa named by Julius von Bergenstamm